Ophisops nictans, the lesser snake-eyed lacerta, is a species of lizard found in Sri Lanka and India.

Distribution
Northeast and eastern India, eastern Sri Lanka.

References
 Deraniyagala, P. 1971 A new lizard from Ceylon. Spol. Zeylan., 32: 103–105.

Ophisops
Reptiles of India
Reptiles of Sri Lanka
Reptiles described in 1989